A serial killer is typically a person who murders three or more people, in two or more separate events over a period of time, for primarily psychological reasons. There are gaps of time between the killings, which may range from a few days to months, or many years.

This list shows all known serial killers from the 20th century to present day by number of victims, then possible victims, then date. For those from previous centuries, see List of serial killers before 1900. In many cases, the exact number of victims assigned to a serial killer is not known, and even if that person is convicted of a few, there can be the possibility that they killed many more.

Organization and ranking of serial killings is made difficult by the complex nature of serial killers and incomplete knowledge of the full extent of many killers' crimes. To address this, multiple categories have been provided in order to more accurately describe the nature of certain serial murders. This is not a reflection of an individual's overall rank, which may or may not vary depending on personal opinion concerning the nature and circumstances of their crimes. The fourth column in the table states the number of victims definitely assigned to that particular serial killer, and thus the table is in order of that figure. The fifth column states the number of possible victims the killer could have murdered. Some of these crimes are unsolved, but are included because they are the work of a serial killer, despite nobody being caught.

This list does not include mass murderers, spree killers, war criminals, members of democidal governments, or major political figures, such as Adolf Hitler, Francisco Franco, Hideki Tojo, Suharto, Mao Zedong, Joseph Stalin, or Pol Pot.

Serial killers with the highest known victim count 

The most prolific modern serial killer is arguably Dr. Harold Shipman, with 218 probable murders and possibly as many as 250 (see "Medical professionals", below). However, he was actually convicted of a sample of 15 murders. Excluding these "Medical professionals and pseudo-medical professionals", with their ability to kill simply and in plain sight, and Serial killer groups and couples (below), this list is a compilation of modern serial killers currently with the highest verifiable murder count.

Serial killers with 15 to 30 proven victims 
This part of the list contains all serial killers with 15 to 30 proven victims who acted alone and were neither medical professionals nor contract killers.

Serial killers with 5 to 14 proven victims 
This part of the list contains all serial killers with five to fourteen proven victims who acted alone and were neither medical professionals nor contract killers.

Serial killers with fewer than five proven victims 
This part of the list contains all serial killers with fewer than five proven victims who acted alone and were neither medical professionals nor contract killers.

Medical professionals and pseudo-medical professionals

Serial killer groups and couples

Disputed cases 

* Proven victims being either victims the serial killer was convicted of killing, victims declared by the killer in a detailed confession, or those whose status as a victim most scholars of the subject agree upon.

See also 

 List of serial killers by country
 List of serial rapists by number of victims

Explanatory notes

References 

Lists by death toll
serial victims